Juri Tamburini (born 7 July 1977) is an Italian footballer who played for many years in Serie B.

Biography
Born in Cattolica, the Province of Rimini, Romagna, Tamburini started his career at Romagna team Cesena. He played for Cesena in 1995–96 Anglo-Italian Cup. He left for Chieti and played 29 games in 1996–97 Serie C2.

In 1999 Tamburini left for Vicenza. He left for Salernitana in temporary deal after Vicenza promoted back to 2000–01 Serie A. Despite Vicenza relegated for just 1 season, his loan was renewed.

In 2004 Tamburini left for Modena. Tamburini played for the club for 7 seasons. In 2011 Tamburini was signed by Ascoli Calcio 1898.

In January 2012 Tamburini was transferred to Pergocrema.

Italian football scandal
In May 2012, Modena received two penalty points as several players, including Tamburini, had been accused of match fixing.

On 31 May 2012 he was banned 10 months due to involvement in 2011–12 Italian football scandal (formal announcement on 18 June). Gianni Rosati, sports director of Reggina, had asked Tamburini to make contact with Antonio Narciso (by then Grosseto player, former Modena team-mate) in order to alter the match Reggina–Grosseto. The round 40 match Reggina 1–0 won and ultimately Reggina qualified to promotion playoffs as the 6th place (last berth).

References

External links
 Football.it Profile 

Italian footballers
A.C. Cesena players
S.S. Chieti Calcio players
L.R. Vicenza players
U.S. Salernitana 1919 players
Modena F.C. players
Ascoli Calcio 1898 F.C. players
U.S. Pergolettese 1932 players
Serie B players
Association football fullbacks
Sportspeople from the Province of Rimini
1977 births
Living people
Footballers from Emilia-Romagna